Bruno Chevillon (born 23 August 1959) is a French jazz double bassist who is well known in avant-garde jazz as well as in new improvised music.

Life 
Chevillon was then associated with a large part of the clarinettist's projects.

In addition to his long collaboration with Sclavis, the double bassist plays with the main actors of avant-garde jazz and Free improvisation : Marc Ducret, Claude Barthélemy, Stéphan Oliva, François Corneloup, François Raulin, Joey Baron, Elliott Sharp, Franck Vigroux, Benjamin de la Fuente, Samuel Sighicelli, Laurent Dehors, Gerome Nox etc.

Essentially a sideman, Chevillon also flourishes as a soloist, however, notably in his performance on Pier Paolo Pasolini. Contemporary classical music is also part of his work.

In 2007, he recorded his only solo album Hors-Champ published on the label d'Autres Cordes, which mixes double bass and electronics. In 2014, he joins the [National Jazz Orchestra] as artistic advisor, alongside Olivier Benoit.

Recordings 

 1994: Acoustic Quartet, with Louis Sclavis, Dominique Pifarély, Marc Ducret - ECM
 1999: L'Ombra Di Verdi within the Marc Ducret Trio - Screwgun Records
 2007: Hors-Champ - d'Autres Cordes
 2011 : Old And Unwise, with Tim Berne - Clean Feed
 2012: Caravaggio #2 within the group Caravaggio (Benjamin de la Fuente, Éric Échampard and Samuel Sighicelli) - La Buissonne
 2013: Stretching Out with Samo Salamon, Dominique Pifarely and Roberto Dani - Samo Records

References

External links 
 
 
 Bruno Chevillon, on the site of the Orchestre national de jazz

French jazz double-bassists
1959 births
Living people
People from Vaucluse
Free improvising musicians
École des Beaux-Arts alumni
Clean Feed Records artists